John Leslie Green VC (4 December 1888 – 1 July 1916) was an English recipient of the Victoria Cross, the highest and most prestigious award for gallantry in the face of the enemy that can be awarded to British and Commonwealth forces. An officer in the Royal Army Medical Corps, he served on attachment to The Sherwood Foresters during the First World War. He was posthumously awarded the VC for his actions on 1 July 1916, during the Battle of the Somme.

Early life
John Leslie Green was born in Buckden, Huntingdonshire, on 4 December 1888 to John George and Florence May Green. His father owned land in the area and was also a Justice of the Peace. Known as Leslie to his family, Green attended Felsted School, and went on to study at Downing College, Cambridge. Pursuing a career as a doctor, he studied medicine at St Bartholomew's Hospital in London. He later worked at Huntingdon County Hospital, becoming qualified as a medical doctor in 1911.

First World War
After the outbreak of the First World War, Green was commissioned into the Royal Army Medical Corps. The early part of his military career was spent attached to the South Staffordshire Regiment as a medical officer before being transferred to the Field Ambulance. He was later posted to the Sherwood Foresters with which he went to France as part of the 46th (North Midland) Division, which fought in the Battle of Loos. His brother, who served in the South Staffordshire Regiment, was killed in the battle.

On the first day of the Battle of the Somme, the 46th Division was tasked with capturing Gommecourt Wood and then linking up the 56th (London) Division which had been allocated the objective of Gommecourt Park, to the south. This was a diversionary attack, designed to draw German forces away from the battlefield further south. Beginning its advance at 7:25 am, the Sherwood Foresters had great difficulty moving forward due to heavy machinegun fire coming from Gommecourt Wood. Green, at the rear of the battalion, came across Captain Frank Robinson, who had been wounded and become entangled in barbed wire. Under heavy machinegun fire, Green extracted Robinson to a nearby shellhole and performed initial treatment on the wounds before carrying him back to British lines. Robinson was wounded again during this process and Green was killed by gunfire to the head while attending to his latest wound. Although Robinson was taken to hospital for treatment, he died of his wounds two days later.

For his actions on 1 July 1916, Green was awarded the Victoria Cross (VC). The VC, instituted in 1856, was the highest award for valour that could be bestowed on a soldier of the British Empire. The citation for his VC reads:

Green is buried at Foncquevillers Military Cemetery. In 1921, Green's father built a memorial to the men of Buckden village who had been killed in the war and the names of his two sons are listed; they are also on the roll of honour in the village church. He appears on war memorials in Houghton where there is also a Leslie Green Road. Green is also remembered by plaques at Felsted School and the Royal Army Medical Corps College in London.

Victoria Cross
Green had married Edith Moss, also a doctor, earlier in the year and she was presented with Green's VC by King George V on 7 October 1916. She later remarried and gifted the medal to the Royal Army Medical Corps. It is displayed at the Museum of Military Medicine in Mytchett, Surrey.

Notes

References

External links
 

1888 births
1916 deaths
Alumni of Downing College, Cambridge
Alumni of the London Hospital Medical College
British Army personnel of World War I
British Battle of the Somme recipients of the Victoria Cross
British military personnel killed in the Battle of the Somme
People from Buckden, Cambridgeshire
Royal Army Medical Corps officers
People educated at Felsted School
British Army recipients of the Victoria Cross
Burials at Foncquevillers Military Cemetery
Military personnel from Cambridgeshire